Waukegan is a railroad station in Waukegan, Illinois, served by Metra's Union Pacific North Line. In Metra's zone-based fare system, Waukegan is in zone H. As of 2018, Waukegan is the 67th busiest of Metra's 236 non-downtown stations, with an average of 764 weekday boardings.

As of April 25, 2022, Waukegan is served by 23 trains in each direction on weekdays, by all 13 trains in each direction on Saturdays, and by all nine trains in each direction on Sundays.

A total of 18 outbound trains terminate at Waukegan, along with 17 inbound trains originating here, on weekdays. On Saturdays, six outbound trains terminate at Waukegan while eight inbound trains originate here. On Sundays, six outbound trains terminate at Waukegan and six inbound trains originate here.

Although Waukegan Station is not the terminus of the Union Pacific North Line, most trains along the line end at Waukegan. The station not only contains storage tracks for Metra trains, but is also located near freight lines for the Union Pacific Railroad as well as the former Elgin, Joliet and Eastern Railway. There is also a Union Pacific freight yard adjacent to the station and freight trains are often parked and sorted here. In addition, the station serves as a stop for the Great Lakes Naval Training Center. Passengers who wish to travel to the  Metra station can use Pace's route 571, which provides daily service between the two stations.

Waukegan Station is located very near to downtown Waukegan, home to attractions such as the Genesee Theatre. Located at the bottom of the bluff that overlooks Lake Michigan, the station is immediately downhill from the historic Carnegie Library building. Other historic buildings in the area include the old houses of the Shimer College Historic District, site of that school's campus until 2006. Buses connect the station to attractions further inland, such as Six Flags Great America in Gurnee.

Bus connections
Pace
 561 Castlecrest via McAree 
 562 Gurnee via Sunset 
 563 Great Lakes Naval Station 
 564 Jackson/14th 
 565 Grand Avenue 
 568 Belvidere 
 571 Zion 
 572 Washington

References

External links

Metra - Waukegan station
Freight Yard near Waukegan Station (Metra Fan Photos)
Metra & Chicago & Northwestern locomotives at Waukegan Yards (Trains.Net)
Chicago Railfan.net:
Waukegan Union Pacific Locomotive Yard, Shop Yard, Other Yard
Station House from Google Maps Street View

Metra stations in Illinois
Former Chicago and North Western Railway stations
Waukegan, Illinois
Railway stations in Lake County, Illinois
Railway stations in the United States opened in 1900
Union Pacific North Line